Fast train may refer to:

High-speed rail, operated in countries such as France and Japan
Express train, a train making a limited number of stops
Semi-express train, train with lower priority and more stops than the express train, but with higher priority and fewer stations than the local train.

Arts and entertainment
Fast Train (film), a 1988 Soviet television film
"Fast Train" (song), a 1971 single by Canadian rock band April Wine
"Fast Train", a song by Van Morrison from his 2002 album Down the Road
Covered by Solomon Burke on the 2002 album Don't Give Up on Me
"Fast Train", a song by James Blundell from the 1993 album Touch of Water

See also
 Very Fast Train
 Fast transport